The  was a Bo-Bo wheel arrangement AC electric locomotive type operated on passenger and freight services in the north of Japan from 1986, originally by Japanese National Railways (JNR), and later by Hokkaido Railway Company (JR Hokkaido) and Japan Freight Railway Company (JR Freight) until 2016.

Variants
 ED79-0: Numbers ED79-1 – 21 (converted from ED75-700, 1986-1987)
 ED79-50: Numbers ED79-51 – 60 (built from new)
 ED79-100: Number ED79-101 – 113 (converted from ED75-700, 1986-1987)

ED79-0
21 Class ED79-0 locomotives were converted between 1986 and 1987 at JNR's Omiya, Tsuchizaki, and Naebo Workshops from former Class ED75-700 locomotives to haul both freight and passenger trains through the undersea Seikan Tunnel between the main island of Honshu and the northern island of Hokkaido, which opened in March 1988. The gear ratio was reduced from the 4.44 of the original ED75 locomotives to 3.38, giving a top speed of  better suited to express passenger and freight workings. With the privatization of JNR on 1 April 1987, all 21 locomotives were transferred to the ownership of JR Hokkaido.

Daytime Kaikyo services previously hauled by Class ED79 locomotives between Aomori and Hakodate through the Seikan Tunnel were discontinued in 2002, replaced by the Hakucho and Super Hakucho limited express services using electric multiple unit (EMU) trains). In 2006, the Nihonkai sleeping car service no longer ran through the tunnel, and JR Freight also ceased using JR Hokkaido locomotives on freight services, due to the increased availability of Class EH500 locomotives.

By 1 April 2013, nine Class ED79-0 locomotives remained in service, owned by JR Hokkaido and based at Hakodate Depot. These were used to haul the Cassiopeia, Hokutosei, Twilight Express, and Hamanasu overnight services between Aomori and Hakodate via the Seikan Tunnel. All remaining locomotives had been withdrawn by March 2016.

The fleet details are shown below.

Special liveries

From February 2000, eight locomotives (numbers 3, 8, 10, 11, 14, 17, 19, and 21) received differing Doraemon liveries.

ED79-50
10 Class ED79-50 locomotives were built between 1989 and 1990 by Toshiba for JR Freight for use on freight services through the Seikan Tunnel. These locos were finished from new in the then-new JR Freight livery of pale purple and two-tone blue, with maroon ("Red No. 2") cab doors.

, nine out of the original ten Class ED79-50 locomotives remained in service, owned by JR Freight and based at Goryokaku Depot. These were normally used in pairs to haul freight services between Higashi-Aomori and Goryokaku via the Seikan Tunnel. All were scheduled to be withdrawn by March 2016 when the line voltage through the Seikan Tunnel was raised from 20 kV AC to 25 kV AC with the opening of the Hokkaido Shinkansen.

The withdrawal dates for the fleet are shown below.

ED79-100
13 Class ED79-100 locomotives were converted between 1986 and 1987 at JNR's Omiya, Tsuchizaki, and Naebo Workshops from former Class ED75-700 locomotives. As with the ED79-0 subclass, these were intended to haul freight and passenger trains through the undersea Seikan Tunnel between Honshu and Hokkaido, but as a cost-saving measure, only one cab end was equipped with the necessary ATC equipment, so these locomotives were only able to operate in multiple with an ED79-0 locomotive and were not permitted to run singly through the tunnel. An ED79-100 locomotive would be coupled at the northern end of an ED75-0.

With the privatization of JNR on 1 April 1987, all 13 locomotives were transferred to the ownership of JR Hokkaido, although they were also loaned for use on JR Freight services until 2006. The last remaining member of the sub-class was withdrawn in March 2009.

The fleet details are shown below.

Classification

The ED79 classification for this locomotive type is explained below.
 E: Electric locomotive
 D: Four driving axles
 7x: AC locomotive with maximum speed exceeding

References

20 kV AC locomotives
Electric locomotives of Japan
1067 mm gauge locomotives of Japan
Railway locomotives introduced in 1986
Japanese National Railways
Hokkaido Railway Company
Japan Freight Railway Company
Scrapped locomotives